Joe Wigmore was an English professional footballer. He played in the Football League for Huddersfield Town.

References

1891 births
1949 deaths
People from Kiveton Park
Sportspeople from Yorkshire
Association football outside forwards
English footballers
Kiveton Park F.C. players
English Football League players